James Abner Smith (November 24, 1873 – November 14, 1947), a.k.a. Stub Smith, was a shortstop in Major League Baseball. He played for the Boston Beaneaters in 1898 and was 5'6" in height.

External links

1873 births
1947 deaths
Major League Baseball shortstops
Boston Beaneaters players
19th-century baseball players
Baseball players from Illinois
Fall River Indians players
Hartford Cooperatives players
Newark Colts players
Portland Phenoms players
Worcester Farmers players
Norfolk Phenoms players
New Orleans Pelicans (baseball) players
Shreveport Giants players
Shreveport Pirates (baseball) players
Denver Grizzlies players
Memphis Egyptians players